Attidiya South Grama Niladhari Division is a  Grama Niladhari Division of the  Ratmalana Divisional Secretariat  of Colombo District  of Western Province, Sri Lanka .  It has Grama Niladhari Division Code 543B.

Ratmalana Airport and Ratmalana  are located within, nearby or associated with Attidiya South.

Attidiya South is a surrounded by the  Vihara, Ratmalana East, Boralesgamuwa West B, Werahera North, Kandawala, Attidiya North, Piriwena and Katukurunduwatta  Grama Niladhari Divisions.

Demographics

Ethnicity 

The Attidiya South Grama Niladhari Division has  a Sinhalese majority (90.9%) . In comparison, the Ratmalana Divisional Secretariat (which contains the Attidiya South Grama Niladhari Division) has  a Sinhalese majority (78.9%).

Religion 

The Attidiya South Grama Niladhari Division has  a Buddhist majority (82.1%) . In comparison, the Ratmalana Divisional Secretariat (which contains the Attidiya South Grama Niladhari Division) has  a Buddhist majority (70.0%) and a significant Muslim population (11.3%)

Gallery

References 

Colombo District
Grama Niladhari divisions of Sri Lanka